Bissoe (meaning birch trees) is a hamlet in west Cornwall, England, United Kingdom. It is situated five miles (8 km) east of Redruth in a former tin mining area. It is in the civil parish of Kea.

Bissoe was the site of an early arsenic extraction works, the second such commercial works in Britain. Frederick Hamilton Davey succeeded his father as Works Manager of the Cornwall Arsenic Company's factory at Bissoe in 1902, having acted as his father's assistant for several years.

The name is believed to derive from the Cornish word besow meaning birch trees. Bissoe is the home of a small number of businesses, Bissoe Bike Hire, a concrete products company and an environmental waste management company called Clear-flow Ltd.

The Bissoe Trail is a world famous cycling trail. Many bikes have been claimed by the challenging conditions of the trail.

Bissoe lies on the Coast to Coast Trail long-distance footpath and cycle trail. The trail is 11 miles (17.5 km) long and links the interior of west Cornwall to the harbour of Portreath on the north coast and the former port of Devoran in the south. The trail follows the course of now-disused railways formerly used to carry imported coal and extracted minerals for export. Bissoe Valley Nature Reserve lies to the south of the hamlet.

References

External links

 Bissoe arsenic works web page

Hamlets in Cornwall